Richard Lalor Sheil (17 August 1791 – 23 May 1851), Irish politician, writer and orator, was born at Drumdowney, Slieverue, County Kilkenny, Ireland. The family was temporarily domiciled at Drumdowney while their new mansion at Bellevue, near Waterford, was under construction.

Life
His father was Edward Sheil, who had acquired considerable wealth in Cadiz in southern Spain and owned an estate in Tipperary. His mother was Catherine McCarthy of Springhouse, near Bansha, County Tipperary, a member of the old aristocratic family of MacCarthy Reagh of Springhouse, who in their time were Princes of Carbery and Counts of Toulouse in France. The son was taught French and Latin by the Abbé de Grimeau, a French refugee. He was then sent to a Catholic school in Kensington, London, presided over by a French nobleman, M. de Broglie. For a time he attended the lay college in St Patrick's College, Maynooth. In October 1804, he was removed to Stonyhurst College, Lancashire, and in November 1807 entered Trinity College, Dublin, where he specially distinguished himself in the debates of the Historical Society.

After taking his degree in 1811 he was admitted a student of Lincoln's Inn, and was called to the Irish bar in 1814. Sheil was one of the founders of the Catholic Association in 1823 and drew up the petition for inquiry into the mode of administering the laws in Ireland, which was presented in that year to both Houses of Parliament.

In 1825, Sheil accompanied Daniel O'Connell to London to protest against the suppression of the Catholic Association. The protest was unsuccessful, but, although nominally dissolved, the association continued its propaganda after the defeat of the Catholic Relief Bill in 1825. Sheil was one of O'Connell's leading supporters in the agitation persistently carried on until Catholic emancipation was granted in 1829.

In the same year he was returned to Parliament for Milborne Port, and in 1831 for Louth, holding that seat until 1832. He took a prominent part in all the debates relating to Ireland, and although he was greater as a platform orator than as a debater, he gradually won the somewhat reluctant admiration of the House. In August 1839, he became Vice-President of the Board of Trade in Lord Melbourne's ministry.

After the accession of Lord John Russell to power in 1846, he was appointed Master of the Mint, and in 1850 he was appointed minister at the court of Tuscany. He died in Florence on 23 May 1851. His remains were conveyed back to Ireland by a British ship-of-war, and interred at Long Orchard, near Templetuohy, County Tipperary.

George W. E. Russell said of him:Sheil was very small, and of mean presence; with a singularly fidgety manner, a shrill voice, and a delivery unintelligibly rapid. But in sheer beauty of elaborated diction not O'Connell nor any one else could surpass him.

Works
Shiel's play, Adelaide, or the Emigrants, was performed at the Crow Street Theatre in Dublin, on 19 February 1814, with success, and, on 23 May 1816, it was performed at Covent Garden in London. The Apostate, produced at the latter theatre on 3 May 1817, established his reputation as a dramatist. His other principal plays are Bellamira (written in 1818), Evadne (1819), Damon and Pythias (1821), Huguenot (produced in 1822) and Montini (1820).

In 1822, Sheil began, with William Henry Curran, to contribute to the New Monthly Magazine a series of papers entitled "Sketches of the Irish Bar". Curran in fact did most of the writing. These pieces were edited by Marmion Wilme Savage in 1855 in two volumes, under the title of Sketches Legal and Political. Sheil's Speeches were edited in 1845 by Thomas MacNevin.

Family
In 1816, Shiel married a Miss O'Halloran, niece of Sir William MacMahon, Master of the Rolls in Ireland. They had one son, who predeceased Sheil. His wife died in January 1822. In July 1830, he married Anastasia Lalor Power, a widow. He then added the middle name Lalor.

Further reading
 William McCullagh Torrens, Memoirs of the Right Honourable Richard Lalor Sheil (2 vols, 1855).

References

External links 

"A Greenwich Pensioner!" 1838 caricature of Richard Lalor Shiel MP

1791 births
1851 deaths
Irish male dramatists and playwrights
Members of the Parliament of the United Kingdom for English constituencies
Masters of the Mint
People educated at Stonyhurst College
Alumni of St Patrick's College, Maynooth
Politicians from County Kilkenny
UK MPs 1830–1831
UK MPs 1831–1832
UK MPs 1832–1835
UK MPs 1835–1837
UK MPs 1837–1841
UK MPs 1841–1847
UK MPs 1847–1852
Alumni of Trinity College Dublin
19th-century Irish dramatists and playwrights
Members of the Privy Council of the United Kingdom
Members of the Parliament of the United Kingdom for County Louth constituencies (1801–1922)
Members of the Parliament of the United Kingdom for County Tipperary constituencies (1801–1922)
Members of the Parliament of the United Kingdom for County Waterford constituencies (1801–1922)
Irish Repeal Association MPs